Afonso Cunha is a municipality in the state of Maranhão in the Northeast region of Brazil.

The municipality lies in the Munim River basin.

See also
List of municipalities in Maranhão

References

Municipalities in Maranhão